Larry Keith Yáñez Zúñiga (born 28 April 1981) is a Peruvian footballer who plays as a full back or midfielder for FBC Melgar in the Torneo Descentralizado.

Club career
Larry Yáñez began his career with local side Atlético Universidad in 2002. There he featured alongside players like Christian Zúñiga, Jorge Alegría, Héctor Rojas, and won the 2002 Copa Perú title. The following seasons he played in the top-flight, the Torneo Descentralizado with the newly promoted Atlético Universidad.
 
Then in July 2004 Yáñez joined Arequipa giants FBC Melgar. However, his time there was short and stayed until the end of the 2004 season.

The following season, he returned to Atlético Universidad and then in 2006 had a spell with Sport Ancash.

References

1981 births
Living people
People from Castilla Province
Peruvian footballers
Atlético Universidad footballers
FBC Melgar footballers
Sport Áncash footballers
Total Chalaco footballers
Sporting Cristal
Cobresol FBC footballers
Peruvian Primera División players
Association football fullbacks
Association football midfielders